Leo Abraham Kraft (July 24, 1922 – April 30, 2014) was an American composer, author, and educator.

Kraft was born in Brooklyn, New York. He held degrees from Queens College (CUNY) and Princeton University. He studied composition with Karol Rathaus, Randall Thompson, and Nadia Boulanger. His music has been recorded on several labels, including Centaur Records, Albany Records, and Arizona University Recordings.

In addition, Kraft taught at Queens College for many years.

References

External links
Leo Kraft's website
Leo Kraft interview, May 7, 1988

American male classical composers
American classical composers
Jewish American classical composers
20th-century classical composers
Musicians from Brooklyn
1922 births
2014 deaths
20th-century American composers
Classical musicians from New York (state)
20th-century American male musicians
Centaur Records artists
Queens College, City University of New York alumni
Princeton University alumni
21st-century American Jews